Flemingsberg Church is a church building in Flemingsberg, Huddinge, Sweden that is part of the Church of Sweden.

History
The church and its parish house were built in connection with the construction of a new city centre in Flemingsberg in the mid-1970s. The church was designed by architect Gunnar Cedervall. It was consecrated on 26 September 1976 by the Bishop of Stockholm, Ingmar Ström.

References 

Churches in Stockholm
1976 establishments in Sweden